Closer or Closers may refer to:

Film and television 
 Closer (2000 film), a documentary by Tina Gharavi
 Closer (2004 film), a 2004 adaptation of Patrick Marber's play (see below), directed by Mike Nichols
 The Closer, a 1990 movie, starring Danny Aiello, based on the play Wheelbarrow Closers
 Closer (TV series), a Canadian music program
 The Closer (1998 TV series), an American sitcom
 The Closer, a 2000s American drama series
 "The Closer" (CSI: NY), an episode of CSI: NY
 The Closer (2021 film), a 2021 television stand-up comedy special by Dave Chappelle

Literature 
 Closer (novel), a novel by Roderick Gordon
 The Closers, a novel by Michael Connelly
 Closer, a novel by Dennis Cooper
 Closer, a graphic novel by Antony Johnston and Mike Norton
 Closer (play), a 1997 play by Patrick Marber
 "Closer", a short story by Greg Egan
 "Closer", a short story by David Malouf from his collection Dream Stuff

Music

Bands 
 Closer (band), a rock band from New York City

Albums 
 Closer (Better Than Ezra album), and the title song, 2001
 Closer (Christopher album), 2016
 Closer (Goapele album), and the title song, 2001
 Closer (Josh Groban album), 2003
 Closer (Joy Division album), 1980
 Closer (Melba Moore album), and the title song, 1980
 Closer (Mike Stud album), and the title song, 2014
 Closer (Paul Bley album), 1966
 Closer (Plastikman album), 2003
 Closer (Presence album), 2014
 Closer (Shayne Ward album), 2015
 Closer (Shawn McDonald album), 2011
 Closer (Susan Ashton album), 1999
 Closer (Ty album), 2006
 Closer (Jars of Clay EP), and the title song, 2008
 Closer (Kane Brown EP), and the title song, 2015
 Closer (Oh My Girl EP), and the title song, 2015
 Closer: The Best of Sarah McLachlan, 2008
 Closer, by David Sanborn, 2005
 Closer, by Brandon Lake, 2016
 The Closers, by SonReal and Rich Kidd 2012

Songs 
 "Closer" (Capone-N-Noreaga song), 1997, from The War Report
 "Closer" (The Chainsmokers song), 2016, featuring Halsey
 "Closer" (Corinne Bailey Rae song), 2010, from The Sea
 "Closer" (The Corrs song), 1997
 "Closer" (Jars of Clay song), 2008
 "Closer" (Joe Inoue song), from Me! Me! Me!, 2008
 "Closer" (Mandy Capristo song), 2012, from Grace
 "Closer" (Maverick City Music song), 2020, from Maverick City, Vol. 3 Pt. 2
 "Closer" (Michael Paynter song), 2008
 "Closer" (Ne-Yo song), 2008, from Year of the Gentleman
 "Closer" (Nine Inch Nails song), 1994, from The Downward Spiral
 "Closer" (Saweetie song), 2022, from Pretty Bitch Music
 "Closer" (Slinkee Minx song), 2004
 "Closer" (Tegan and Sara song), 2012
 "Closer" (Travis song), 2007, from The Boy with No Name
 "Closer/Sweet Dreams", by Nylon, 2006
 "Closer", by Aerosmith from Music from Another Dimension!
 "Closer", by Anathema from A Natural Disaster
 "Closer", by Anberlin from Dark Is the Way, Light Is a Place
 "Closer", by Baboon from We Sing and Play
 "Closer", by Better Than Ezra from Closer
 "Closer", by deadmau5 from Album Title Goes Here
 "Closer", by Dido from Life for Rent, where it is an unlisted bonus track
 "Closer", by Dirty Vegas from One
 "Closer", by Earshot from The Silver Lining
 "Closer", by The Firm from The Firm
 "Closer", by fka Twigs from LP1
 "Closer", by Fool's Garden from 25 Miles to Kissimmee
 "Closer", by Girls' Generation from Forever 1
 "Closer", by The Gracious Few from The Gracious Few
 "Closer", by Jack River from Stranger Heart
 "Closer", by Jeff Black from Tin Lily
 "Closer", by Joshua Radin from We Were Here
 "Closer", by Kings of Leon from Only by the Night
 "Closer", by Kylie Minogue from Aphrodite
 "Closer", by Lacuna Coil from Karmacode
 "Closer", by Laleh from Prinsessor
 "Closer", by Lapush from Modern Blues
 "Closer", by Lemaitre from 1749
 "Closer", by Lemon Jelly from Lost Horizons
 "Closer", by Mario from Closer to Mars
 "Closer", by Melanie Chisholm from Northern Star
 "Closer", by Mike Oldfield from Light + Shade
 "Closer", by Mike Stud from Closer
 "Closer", by Mudvayne from their eponymous album
 "Closer", by Nick Jonas from his self-titled album
 "Closer", by Oh My Girl from Closer EP
 "Closer", by Philmont from The Transition EP
 "Closer", by Rae Morris from Unguarded
 "Closer", by Sarah Brightman from Dreamchaser
 "Closer", by Shalamar from The Look
 "Closer", by Six60
 "Closer", by Sugar Ray from Music for Cougars
 "Closer", by Tonight Alive
 "Closer", by The Urge from Master of Styles
 "Closer", by Way Out West from Tuesday Maybe
 "Closer", by Westlife from Gravity
 "The Closer", by VIXX from Kratos

Other uses 
 Closer (magazine), a UK/French women's magazine published by Bauer Media Group
 Closers (video game), a 2014 MMORPG
 Closer (baseball), a specialized relief pitcher
 Kevin Harvick (born 1975), an American racecar driver nicknamed "The Closer"

See also 
 Close (disambiguation)
 Closer to You (disambiguation)